The 1957–58 Polska Liga Hokejowa season was the 23rd season of the Polska Liga Hokejowa, the top level of ice hockey in Poland. Seven teams participated in the league, and Gornik Katowice won the championship.

Regular season

External links
 Season on hockeyarchives.info

Polska
Polska Hokej Liga seasons
1957–58 in Polish ice hockey